German submarine U-955 was a Type VIIC U-boat of Nazi Germany's Kriegsmarine during World War II.

She was ordered on 10 April 1941, and was laid down on 23 February 1942 at Blohm & Voss, Hamburg, as yard number 155. She was launched on 14 November 1942 and commissioned under the command of Oberleutnant zur See Hans-Heinrich Baden on 31 December 1942.

Design
German Type VIIC submarines were preceded by the shorter Type VIIB submarines. U-955 had a displacement of  when at the surface and  while submerged. She had two shafts and two  propellers.

U-955 was fitted with five  torpedo tubes (four fitted at the bow and one at the stern), fourteen torpedoes or 26 TMA mines, one  SK C/35 naval gun, 220 rounds, and one twin  C/30 anti-aircraft gun. The boat had a complement of between 44 — 52 men.

Service history
On 30 April 1944, U-955 landed Ernst Fresenius, Sigurður Juliusson and Hjalti Björnsson, espionage agents, on Iceland.

U-955 was located by radar on 5 May 1944, from a British B-24 Liberator, FK226, of 86 Squadron/G RAF piloted by W/O M.G. Moseley and spotted in the moonlight. After several attempts to get the Liberator into a favorable upmoon attack run contact with U-955 was lost. She had apparently made a crash dive after firing at B-24, which she later claimed at shooting down, even though the B-24 was not hit in the encounter.

On 7 June 1944, U-955 was sunk by depth charges, north of Cape Ortegal, Spain in the Bay of Biscay, from a British Sunderland of 201 Squadron/S RAF. Her crew of 50 were all lost.

References

Bibliography

External links

German Type VIIC submarines
U-boats commissioned in 1942
World War II submarines of Germany
Ships built in Hamburg
1942 ships
Maritime incidents in June 1944
World War II shipwrecks in the Atlantic Ocean